Box Office Bomb is the second album by the alternative rock band Dramarama.

Critical reception
Trouser Press wrote that "while Box Office Bomb suffers slightly from pressed-for-time-and-money production, 'Modesty Personified' still has plenty of Blondiesque bite, and the sextet invigorates Easdale’s vengeful frustration in 'Whenever I’m With Her' ('Sorry I bit her…') with hothouse guitar drama."

Track listing
All songs written by John Easdale, except where noted. 
 "Steve & Edie" - 5:05
 "New Dream" - 3:30
 "Whenever I'm With Her" - 3:09
 "Spare Change" - 3:15
 "400 Blows" - 3:52
 "Pumping (My Heart)" (Patti Smith, Ivan Kral, Jay Dee Daugherty) - 3:16
 "It's Still Warm" - 3:54
 "Out in the Rain" (Easdale, Julie Miller) - 4:13
 "Baby Rhino's Eye" - 5:01
 "Worse Than Being By Myself" - 5:27
 "Modesty Personified" - 4:07

1988 CD bonus tracks (The Best Of Cinema Verite)
"Anything, Anything (I'll Give You)" - 3:44
"Scenario" - 4:14
"Questions?" - 3:12
"Visiting The Zoo" - 3:55
"Candidate" - 3:18
"Some Crazy Dame" - 3:48
"Emerald City" - 3:00

1995 CD reissue bonus tracks
"Hitchhiking" - 3:10
"Private World (David Johansen, Arthur Kane) - 3:37
"Last Cigarette (Demo Version)" - 4:22
"Would You Like (Demo)" - 4:36
"Worse Than Being By Myself (Demo Version)" - 5:13
"It's Still Warm (Original Version)" - 6:22

References 

1989 albums
Dramarama albums